The Bluetones are an English indie rock band, formed in Hounslow, Greater London, in 1993. The band's members are Mark Morriss on vocals, Adam Devlin on guitar, Mark's brother Scott Morriss on bass guitar, and Eds Chesters on drums. A fifth member, Richard Payne, came on board between 1998 and 2002. The band was originally named "The Bottlegarden".

The band has scored thirteen Top 40 singles and three Top 10 albums in the UK charts.  Although their commercial success waned in the post-Britpop era, they continued to tour and release new records. Their most recent album A New Athens was released in May 2010.

History
After the release of two singles on Fierce Panda Records, the band signed to A&M Records and released Expecting to Fly on their own sublabel Superior Quality Recordings. The album entered the UK Albums Chart at number one, and featured the singles "Bluetonic" and "Slight Return", with the latter climbing to #2 on the UK charts. Following the touring and promotional duties for Expecting to Fly, the band released stand-alone single "Marblehead Johnson" to bridge the gap between albums.

The second Bluetones album, Return to the Last Chance Saloon, was released in 1998. While failing to repeat the commercial success of their debut, it reached the top 10 in the UK album charts and spawned the hit singles "Solomon Bites the Worm" and "If...".

In 2000 the Bluetones released their third album, Science & Nature, which again reached the Top 10 and featured the hit singles "Keep the Home Fires Burning" and "Autophilia".

After a best-of album in 2002, the band released their fourth studio album Luxembourg to mixed reviews in 2003.

A three-album deal was signed in late 2005 with the Cooking Vinyl record label, promptly followed by the limited release of E.P. Serenity Now and a full UK tour.

In early 2006, Universal issued a comprehensive box set of all The Bluetones singles and B-sides released between 1995 and 2003, A Rough Outline.

A single, entitled "My Neighbour's House", was released in the UK on 18 September 2006. The single was taken from their self-titled album, which was released on 9 October that year. It failed to chart in the UK Albums Chart after its first week on sale. The album was also released in the United States, the first such occurrence since their debut. Although no reason was cited, on 1 October 2006, it was announced that a planned nine-date tour of North America and Australia had been scrapped. However, on 1 November 2006, the band began a month-long tour of Europe in support of their new release, including two sold-out nights at Glasgow's King Tuts.

In February 2007, the band released BBC Radio Sessions containing tracks recorded for the BBC between 1994 and 2000. This was followed in June with their first full live album, Once Upon a Time in West Twelve, recorded at the Shepherd's Bush Empire on 18 November 2005, and was followed on 29 October 2007, by a live DVD of the same concert under the title Beat about the Bush. 2007 also saw the release of a compilation album of early demo recordings, entitled The Early Garage Years. They also released a DVD under the title Blue Movies, which includes all of their 15 music videos.

In January 2008, the band began a mini-tour of Scotland, playing five cities (Stirling, Dunfermline, Aberdeen, Glasgow and Edinburgh) in as many nights. In May 2008 a ten-date tour covered Cambridge, Whitehaven, Sheffield, Newcastle upon Tyne, Birmingham, London, Bristol, Manchester and Darwen, including one of the last few concerts at the Astoria. They also played a gig with Dodgy on 17 May 2009, at a secret London venue, to benefit the homelessness charity Crisis, as part of the charity's 'Hidden Gigs' campaign against hidden homelessness.

In December 2008, the band embarked on a five-date tour, taking in Lincoln, Manchester, Sheffield and Birmingham. The tour saw them playing their debut album, Expecting to Fly, in full. Some further dates were subsequently announced for February and March 2009.

On 31 May 2010, the band released a new album entitled A New Athens. Despite moderate praise the album failed to chart in the UK Albums Chart.

On 28 March 2011, the band announced they would split after a farewell tour in the autumn. On 13 April 2015, the band announced that they would reform for a new UK tour.

In Summer 2017 they co-headlined the Star Shaped Festival tour run by the popular Britpop club of the same name alongside the newly reformed Sleeper. This took place in Birmingham, London, Manchester & Glasgow in July and August 2017.

Discography

The discography of The Bluetones, an English indie rock band, consists of six studio albums, six compilation albums, one live album, three extended plays (EPs), twenty singles and four video releases.

Studio albums

Live albums
Once Upon a Time in West Twelve (2007)
Bluetonic (2017)

Compilation albums

Extended plays
A Bluetones Companion (1995, Japan only)
Mudslide (2000)
Serenity Now (2005, mail-order-only release)

Singles

Video/DVD releases
Mondo Concerto (1997)
Blue Movies (2007)
Beat about the Bush (2007)
Expecting to Fly Live (2009)

References

External links
http://bluetones.band/ The Bluetones' official website
www.myspace.com/thebluetones The Bluetones' official MySpace
www.bluetones.org.uk A Bluetones fan page

Britpop groups
English indie rock groups
Musical groups from the London Borough of Hounslow
Musical groups established in 1993
Musical groups disestablished in 2011
Musical groups reestablished in 2015
Cooking Vinyl artists
A&M Records artists
Mercury Records artists